The Nigerian National Assembly delegation from Abia comprises three Senators representing Abia Central, Abia South, and Abia North, and eight Representatives representing Ikwuano/Umuahia North/Umuahia South, Bende, Isuikwato/Umunneochi, Arochukwu/Ohafia, Aba North/Aba South, Ukwa East/Ukwa West, Isiala Ngwa North/South and Obingwa/Osisioma/Ugbunagbo.

Fourth Republic

The 4th National Assembly (1999 - 2003)
The senators
and representatives of the 4th National Assembly were:

The 5th National Assembly (2003 - 2007)
The senators
and representatives of the 5th National Assembly were:

The 6th National Assembly (2007 - 2011)
The senators and representatives of the 6th National Assembly were:

The 7th National Assembly (2011 - 2015)
The senators and representatives for the 7th National Assembly were:

The 8th National Assembly (2015 - 2019)
The senators and representatives for the 8th National Assembly were:

The 9th National Assembly (2019 - 2023)
The senators and representatives for the 9th National Assembly were:

Notes

Politics of Abia State
National Assembly (Nigeria) delegations by state